Go Get 'Em Hutch is a 1922 American drama film serial directed by George B. Seitz. The story concerns a crooked lawyer who is the head of a crime syndicate. He seeks to prevent the operation of the ships owned by the heroine, played by Marguerite Clayton. Hutch, the title character played by Charles Hutchison, comes to her rescue.

The film is presumed to be lost however all or parts are listed as being held at Gosfilmofond, the National Film Foundation of the Russian Federation.

Plot
As described in a film magazine, the theme centers around Hutch McClellund (Hutchison), owner of McClellund Shipping Industries, who forms a partnership with Dariel Bainbridge (Clayton), who has inherited her father's shipbuilding business. Hilton Lennox (Neill) and Fay Vallon (Shepard) are unscrupulous plotters who aim to prevent Hutch from getting his ships out to sea with their cargoes. These obstacles allow Hutch numerous opportunities for spectacular stunts.

Cast
 Charles Hutchison as Hutch McClellund
 Marguerite Clayton as Dariel Bainbridge
 Richard Neill as Hilton Lennox
 Frank Hagney
 Pearl Shepard as Fay Vallon
 Joe Cuny
 Cecile Bonnel

Chapter titles
 Chained to the Anchor
 The Falling Wall
 The Runaway Car
 The Crushing Menace
 Shot into Space
 Under the Avalanche
 On Danger's Highway
 The Broken Life Line
 Under the Cauldron
 The Edge of the Roof
 The Air-Line Route
 Between the Rails
 Under the Ice
 In the Doorway of Death
 Ten Minutes to Live

See also
 List of film serials
 List of film serials by studio

References

External links

Advertisement in Motion Picture News Vol 25 No. 17 (April 15, 1922) at Internet Archive

1922 films
1922 drama films
1922 lost films
1920s action drama films
American action drama films
American silent serial films
American black-and-white films
Films directed by George B. Seitz
Lost American films
Lost action drama films
1920s American films
Silent American drama films
Silent action drama films